The Cancionero de Medinaceli or Cancionero Musical de Medinaceli (CMM) is a manuscript containing Spanish music of the Renaissance. It was copied during the second half of the 16th century and kept at the library of the Duke of Medinaceli's house, hence its name. Is it probably the most important compilation of Spanish secular polyphony of the Renaissance after the Cancionero de Palacio.

External links

Music books
Chansonniers (books)
Renaissance music manuscript sources
Spanish music
Medinaceli